Fatherland for All (Patria Para Todos, PPT) is a leftist political party in Venezuela. It was founded on September 27, 1997 by members of The Radical Cause party led by Pablo Medina, Aristóbulo Istúriz and Alí Rodríguez Araque. In 1998 the PPT supported the first presidential candidacy of Hugo Chávez. It is currently led by Rafael Uzcátegui.

In the 2015 legislative elections held on 6 December, Fatherland for All backed the governmental electoral alliance Great Patriotic Pole (GPP). On this occasion, the party did not win any constituency representative out of 167 seats available at the unicameral National Assembly. Thus, it has no deputies of its own for the 2016–2021 term and is bound by law to renew its credentials with the National Electoral Council to keep functioning as a political party. In the previous 2010 legislative elections, Fatherland for All had won 2 out of 165 seats in the National Assembly.

References

External links
  TSJ designó a Rafael Uzcátegui como Secretario General del PPT

1997 establishments in Venezuela
Bolivarian Revolution
Democratic socialist parties in South America
Political parties established in 1997
Political parties in Venezuela
Socialist parties in Venezuela